Mr. District Attorney is a 1941 American comedy film directed by William Morgan and written by Karl Brown and Malcolm Stuart Boylan. The film was based on the long running and popular radio series Mr. District Attorney. It stars Dennis O'Keefe, Florence Rice, Peter Lorre, Stanley Ridges, Minor Watson and Charles Arnt. The film was released on March 27, 1941, by Republic Pictures. It was followed by a sequel Mr. District Attorney in the Carter Case later in the year, with different actors in the leading roles.

Plot
A well-connected and well-educated young lawyer P. Cadwallader Jones gets an appointment as deputy district attorney through the influence of his uncle. After embarrassing his superior in court, he is punished by being assigned a seemingly unsolvable cold case concerning a notorious embezzler who has been missing for four years. However, with the assistance of a streetwise young female journalist he soon begins making inroads into the mystery.

Cast 
 Dennis O'Keefe as P. Cadwallader Jones
 Florence Rice as Terry Parker
 Peter Lorre as Paul Hyde
 Stanley Ridges as District Attorney Tom F. Winton
 Minor Watson as Arthur Barret
 Charles Arnt as Herman Winkle
 Joan Blair as Betty Paradise
 Charles Halton as Hazelton 
 Alan Edwards as Grew
 George Watts as Judge White
 Sarah Edwards as Miss Petherby
 Helen Brown as Mrs. Paul Hyde

See also 
 Mr. District Attorney in the Carter Case (1941)
 Secrets of the Underground (1942)

References

External links 
 

1941 films
American comedy films
1941 comedy films
Republic Pictures films
Films directed by William Morgan (director)
American black-and-white films
Films scored by Paul Sawtell
1940s English-language films
1940s American films
Works about prosecutors